The Native Laws Amendment Act, 1952 (Act No. 54 of 1952, subsequently renamed the Bantu Laws Amendment Act, 1952 and the Black Laws Amendment Act, 1952), formed part of the apartheid system of racial segregation in South Africa. 
It amended section 10 of the Group Areas Act. It limited the category of blacks who had the right to permanent residence in urban areas. While Section 10 had  granted permanent residence to blacks who had been born in a town and had lived there continuously for more than 15 years, or who had been employed there continuously for at least 15 years, or who had worked continuously for the same employer for more than 10 years. Non-whites living in urban areas who did not meet these criteria faced forcible removal.

References

Apartheid laws in South Africa
1952 in South African law